Andrew M. Duncan (April 17, 1922 – April 12, 2006) was an American professional basketball player. Duncan played collegiately at William & Mary. He was drafted in the 1947 BAA draft by the New York Knicks. He played in the National Basketball League, Basketball Association of America and the National Basketball Association for the Rochester Royals and Boston Celtics from 1947 to 1951.

BAA/NBA career statistics

Regular season

Playoffs

References

External links

1922 births
2006 deaths
Boston Celtics players
Forwards (basketball)
New York Knicks draft picks
Rochester Royals players
William & Mary Tribe men's basketball players
American men's basketball players